AOI: Bionix is the sixth studio album by American hip hop group De La Soul, released on December 4, 2001. The album was the second in a planned three-disc installment, which was originally intended to be a three-disc album. It was the last De La project released on Tommy Boy before the label became defunct.

Overview 
The first single, "Baby Phat" featuring Yummy Bingham and Devin the Dude, was an ode to larger sized women.  Elsewhere, "Held Down", featuring Cee-Lo, found Posdnuos in an introspective mood as he mused on fatherhood, religion, and fame.  Slick Rick also made an appearance on "What We Do (For Love)"; a humorous song about puberty and sexual discovery. Plans were made to release the Kev Brown-produced "Special" (featuring Yummy Bingham) as the second single, however Tommy Boy soon folded as a label, cutting short any further promotion of Bionix. Like many Hip-Hop albums, there is an official instrumental version of the album available on vinyl, with artwork.

Interludes
The album featured skits with a character by the name of Reverend Do Good, which worked as social commentary as well as the intros and outros of the songs. The final Reverend Do Good skit acts as one final advertisement for Ghost Weed as heard on De La Soul's previous album, Art Official Intelligence: Mosaic Thump. A mischievous teenager takes a hit of the substance, then morphs into Slum Village frontman J Dilla, who provides the intro and outro to the marijuana-themed song "Peer Pressure" (which he also produced).

Track listing

Charts

References

External links

De La Soul albums
2001 albums
Tommy Boy Records albums
Warner Records albums
Albums produced by J Dilla